Dawlish Warren is a seaside resort near the town of Dawlish in Teignbridge on the south coast of Devon in England. Dawlish Warren consists almost entirely of holiday accommodation and facilities for holiday-makers especially caravan sites.

Location
Dawlish Warren is located at the mouth of the Exe Estuary opposite Exmouth and has a beach, a National Nature Reserve spanning 506 acres (2 km2) and a golf course, which is classified as a Site of Special Scientific Interest (SSSI).

The renowned sand spit at Dawlish Warren is the location of both the golf course and the nature reserve which was declared a National Nature Reserve in 2000.  This spit has reduced in size within the past century due to erosion partly caused by the installation of a breakwater at Langstone Rock to the south-west which traps sand from the local sandstone cliffs and interrupts the natural sediment flow of the area.

The resort is popular with holidaymakers and although a death occurred from E. coli poisoning in 1999, allegedly caused by a nearby sewage outflow, a new sewage treatment plant has since been built resulting in both Dawlish Warren and Dawlish beaches now winning the Blue Flag for the quality of the bathing waters.

Tourism
Along with neighbouring Dawlish, this corner of south Devon has a favourable climate, which draws thousands of visitors to the area in summer.  Because of this, the Dawlish Warren economy relies heavily on tourism, and in particular on the many caravan and camping parks in the village which add over 15,000 to the local population during the summer months. There are several holiday parks which attract visitors from all over the UK, but in particular the West Midlands and South Wales.  The major holiday parks are Welcome, Hazelwood, Cofton, Golden Sands, Dawlish Sands, Peppermint Park, Lady's Mile and Oakcliff.  In 2008 Peppermint Park and Golden Sands joined Dawlish Sands as part of Park Holidays UK Caravan Parks.  The name 'Peppermint Park' has gone and the site has been rebranded 'Golden Sands'.

Amenities
Aside from the golf course, Dawlish Warren has a doctor's surgery, a pharmacy and an independent supermarket, along with several gift shops which cater for tourist traffic.  It also has a number of restaurants and take-out eateries.  As you would expect for a resort, there are many bars and pubs such as the Silly Goose, and The Mount Pleasant Inn, which dates from before the 1750s, and is located just outside the resort.

Dawlish Warren once had a post office, though this closed in the early 2000s.

Access
The resort is served by Dawlish Warren railway station, situated a few minutes from the beach. The station is between Dawlish and Starcross stations, and is very busy in the summer.

Dawlish can be reached by a 1.5-mile walk south-west along the South Devon Railway sea wall.

Religion
Although Dawlish Warren is within the civil parish of Dawlish, it lies in the ecclesiastical parish of Cofton.  There is no actual church in Dawlish Warren, but St Mary's Church Hall (St Mary's Church is in Cofton) is located near the resort's railway station.  It is used for services, and also for a wide array of community activities.

Gallery

References

External links

 Dawlish Warren Nature Reserve
 

Villages in Devon
Seaside resorts in England
Spits of England
Beaches of Devon
Dawlish